Annona trunciflora is a species of plant in the Annonaceae family. It is endemic to Venezuela.

References

trunciflora
Endemic flora of Venezuela
Near threatened plants
Near threatened biota of South America
Taxonomy articles created by Polbot